Lewan is a surname. Notable people with the surname include:

Jan Lewan, born Jan Lewandowski, (born 1941), Polish-American songwriter and polka band leader
Taylor Lewan (born 1991), American football player

See also
Lewin
Rewan